Guillaume Yenoussi (born 2 June 1997) is a Togolese professional footballer who plays as a winger for Championnat National 2 club Chambly and the Togo national team.

Club career
Yenoussi began his career in Dynamic Togolais, and moved to France with Bergerac in 2018, playing in the Championnat National 2. He moved to Haguenau in 2020, scoring 7 goals in 26 games in his second season.

International career
Yenoussi debuted with the Togo national team in a 0–0 friendly tie with Libya on 24 March 2017. He made 7 appearances with Togo in 2017, before being called up again for matches in June 2022.

References

External links
 
 

1997 births
Living people
Sportspeople from Lomé
Togolese footballers
Togo international footballers
Togo youth international footballers
Association football wingers
Dynamic Togolais players
Bergerac Périgord FC players
FCSR Haguenau players
FC Chambly Oise players
Championnat National 2 players
Togolese expatriate footballers
Expatriate footballers in France
Togolese expatriates in France